The men's tandem cycling event at the 1948 Summer Olympics took place between 7 and 11 August and was one of six events at the 1948 Olympics.

Results

First round
The first round took place on 7 August. The winners from each heat advanced to the quarterfinals. The losing pairs competed in the repechage round.

Heat 1

Heat 2

Heat 3

Heat 4

Heat 5

Repechage
The repechage round took place on 7 August. The winners from each plus the fastest losing team advanced to the quarterfinals.

Heat 1

Heat 2

Quarterfinals
The quarterfinal round took place on 9 August. The winners from each heat advanced to the semifinals.

Heat 1

Heat 2

Heat 3

Heat 4

Semifinals
The semifinal round took place on 9 August. The winners from each heat competed for the gold medal. The remaining teams competed for the bronze.

Heat 1

Heat 2

Final
The final races took place on 11 August and consisted of two best-of-three series. Italy won the gold medal series against the British team 2–1, while France took home the bronze against Switzerland by winning their series 2–0.

Gold medal race

Bronze medal race

Final standings

References

External links
Organising Committee for the XIV Olympiad, The (1948). The Official Report of the Organising Committee for the XIV Olympiad. LA84 Foundation. Retrieved 4 September 2016.

Cycling at the 1948 Summer Olympics
Cycling at the Summer Olympics – Men's tandem
Track cycling at the 1948 Summer Olympics